Irving Edwin Moultrop (1865–1957) was an American engineer who pioneered high-pressure steam boilers for electricity generation. He received the 1930 Elliott Cresson Medal of the Franklin Institute.

References
 Biography of Irving Edwin Moultrop, Edgar Station, Edison Electric Illuminating Co., American Society of Mechanical Engineers, 1976.

1865 births
1957 deaths
American engineers